Vartia is a Finnish surname. Notable people with the surname include:

Ilmari Vartia (1914–1951), Finnish fencer
Raimo Vartia, Finnish basketball player
Taavi Vartia (born 1965), Finnish film director, screenwriter, and writer
Yrjö Vartia (born 1946), Finnish economist

Finnish-language surnames